The Big Snowy Group is a stratigraphical unit of Chesterian age in the Williston Basin.

It takes the name from Big Snowy Mountains in Montana, and was first described on the north slopes of the mountain by H.W. Smith in 1935.

Lithology

Subdivisions
The Big Snowy Group is composed of three subdivisions, from top to base:

Heath Formation: black shale with sandstone lenses.
Otter Formation: limestone and grey to green shale
Kibbey Formation: shaly sandstone

Distribution
It is exposed in outcrop in the Big Snowy Mountains, Little Belt Mountains, Castle Mountains and Lombard Hills of central Montana. It occurs in the sub-surface throughout the central part of the Williston Basin and into a limited area of south-central Saskatchewan.

Relationship to other units

The Big Snowy Group is unconformably overlain by the Tyler Formation in Montana, and by the Watrous Formation in Saskatchewan; It disconformably overlays the Madison Group.

References

Geologic groups of North America
Geologic formations of Montana
Geologic formations of Saskatchewan
Western Canadian Sedimentary Basin
Carboniferous Montana
Carboniferous Saskatchewan
Carboniferous System of North America